Cement Corporation of India Limited (CCI) is the only cement manufacturing Public Sector Undertaking of Government of India. The company was incorporated as a wholly government-owned corporation on 18 January 1965, with the objective of setting up cement units in public sector to help achieve self-sufficiency in cement production in the country.

CCI is based in New Delhi. The corporation manufactures various types of cements, such as Portland pozzolana cement (PPC), Portland slag cement (PSC), and ordinary Portland cement (OPC) of varying grades - 33, 43,53 and 53S (special grade cement for manufacture of sleepers for Indian Railways).

CCI currently has three profit making operating units and various regional centers spread over different Indian states and union territories, with a total annual installed capacity of 38.48 lakh tonne.

Plants
The units are spread throughout the country from East (Bokajan in Assam) to West (Akaltara, Mandhar in Chhattisgarh and Nayagaon in Madhya Pradesh) and from North (Rajban in Himachal Pradesh and Charkhi Dadri in Haryana) to South (Kurkunta in Karnataka and Adilabad, Tandur in Telangana), with one cement grinding unit in Delhi.

The performance of CCI was adversely affected due to severe liquidity crunch and infrastructural constraints particularly related to power shortage. 7 units out of 10 are non-operational due to various reasons, especially after  Mrs Indira Gandhi, the Prime Minister was no more. The company became sick and was referred to BIFR. BIFR had directed the OA to appoint a merchant banker to explore the sale of CCI as a whole as a going concern basis or its units individually or collectively.
(The above para is to be updated as per the status on 2015 as CCI is earning profit year by year after 2007 with its 3 running plants: Rajban, Bokajan & Tandur)

CCI Cement Plants Locations
Rajban in Himachal Pradesh (dry process)
Tandur in Telangana (dry process)
Bokajan in Assam (dry process)
Charkhi Dadri in Haryana (semi-dry process)
Okhla Industrial Area in Delhi (grinding unit; produces around 5 million MT of cement annually)
Neemuch in Madhya Pradesh (dry process)
Akaltara in Chhattisgarh (dry process)
Mandhar in Chhattisgarh (wet process)
Kurkunta in Karnataka (dry process)(Plant is shut down)
Adilabad in Telangana (dry process)

Functional units
Rajban in Himachal Pradesh is around 60 km from the city of Dehradun, Sirmaur district; produces around .98 million MT of Pozzolona Portland cement and ordinary Portland cement annually. The plant also consists of a township which has around 449 accommodation facilities, bank, post offices, telephone exchange and other civic amenities.

Tandur Unit with capacity of 1 Million MT is located at Viakarabad District in Telangana , Having its Marketing Zonal office at Hyderabad head By Mr. YK Singh as Zonal Manager . Mr. Rishikesh Dubey  Nodal Officer Hyderabad .

The Bokajan Cement Plant is around 350 kilometers from the city of Guwahati and around 21 kilometers from the Dimapur Airport. Annually, the plant produces around 1,98,000 MT per year by using the dry process of manufacture. The total area has the factory, the mining area and the township. The township consists of various civic amenities such as health centers, guest houses, bank, post office, telephone exchange and so on.

References

External links
 15 sick public sector units report profits - The Economic Times
 7 CCI plants to be sold - The Tribune Chandigarh

Government-owned companies of India
Companies based in New Delhi
Manufacturing companies based in Delhi
Cement companies of India
Indian companies established in 1965
1965 establishments in Delhi